Graham Brown may refer to:

Graham Brown (actor) (1924–2011), American actor
Graham Brown (cricketer, born 1944), Australian cricketer
Graham Brown (cricketer, born 1966), English cricketer
Graham Brown (footballer, born 1944), English footballer
Graham Brown (footballer, born 1950), English footballer
Graham Brown (writer), American author of thrillers, particularly as co-author with Clive Cussler
W. Graham Browne (1870–1937), Irish actor

See also
Graeme Brown (born 1979), Australian cyclist, Olympic gold medallist
Graeme Brown (footballer) (born 1980), South African-born Scottish footballer